Handan Kara (1 June 1939 – 14 April 2017) was a Turkish classical music singer. She had a prolific career as a Turkish Classical singer, releasing several albums and starring as the voice in several popular Turkish mid-century films.

Early life
She was born in 1939 in the Bakırköy district of Istanbul. After completing her primary and secondary education, she started a career as a civil servant. In 1961, she began taking singing lessons from various voice coaches during her spare time upon the encouragement of her mother and Udi Şevket Tümer, a family friend. While working full time as a civil servant, she began to work as a signer at night. In 1965, as her confidence and experience as a singer grew, she took exams offered by TRT Istanbul Radio in 1965 and was offered an audition whereupon her career as a radio artist began.

Career
She first appeared on the stage in 1965 at TRT Radio in Istanbul. As her career grew, she voiced songs for many Yeşilçam films under the guidance of composer Yıldırım Gürses, especially for actress Türkan Şoray. As her career grew, she performed concerts in cities in Europe and Turkey. She reaching the pinnacle of her career with the work "Last Spring Winds" which played in a number of popular films. She also released a record titled "Cannot Love Kara Gözlüm". She began to collaborate with composer Suat Sayın on the sons "The Endless Ordeal" and "Let Your Ears Ring". She took part as an actor in films such as "Give My Allah Give Me" and "Here Camel Here Hendek" between 1971 and 1972.

In 1974, she got married and moved to Hamburg, Germany due to her husband finding work there. There she founded and directed the Hamburg Turkish Music Choir. She settled into a more domestic life in Germany and continued her work in the arts as a choir conductor.

Personal life
Handan Kara was married in 1974 and became the mother of three children while living in Germany. She returned to Turkey in later life and died on 14 April 2017 at the age of 78 in Istanbul. She was buried in Ortaköy Cemetery in Ortaköy, Istanbul.

Awards
In 2011, she was given an achievement award together with Deniz Türkali at the Flying Broom International Women's Film Festival.

Discography

Albums

Singles

Film

References

1939 births
2017 deaths
Turkish musicians
Turkish music
Musicians from Istanbul